BRG may refer to:

 Berkeley Research Group, LLC, a global expert services and consulting firm
 Borough Green & Wrotham railway station in Kent, England
 British racing green, a dark green colour traditionally used on early UK racing cars
 Brownsville and Rio Grande International Railroad, Texas
 Mareeba Airfield, an airfield located south of Mareeba, Queensland, Australia by IATA code 
 the postal code of Birgu, Malta
 BRG Sports, an American sports equipment manufacturer
 Fiat BRG, a 1930s bomber of the Italian air force
 Baure language (ISO code: brg), a near extinct language of Bolivia